Guns N' Roses is an American hard rock band originally formed in 1985 by members of Hollywood Rose and L.A. Guns. After signing with Geffen Records in 1986, the band released its debut album Appetite for Destruction in 1987. All songs on the album were credited as written by the full band, composed of vocalist Axl Rose, guitarists Slash and Izzy Stradlin, bassist Duff McKagan and drummer Steven Adler, while "It's So Easy" was co-written by West Arkeen and "Anything Goes" was co-written by Chris Weber, formerly of Hollywood Rose. The following year saw the release of the band's second album G N' R Lies, made up of all four tracks from 1986's Live ?!*@ Like a Suicide EP and four acoustic-based tracks.

Following a period of touring, in 1990 Guns N' Roses replaced Adler with Matt Sorum, and keyboardist Dizzy Reed was added to the lineup. On September 17, 1991, the band released its third and fourth studio albums Use Your Illusion I and Use Your Illusion II. The songs on the albums were credited to their individual songwriters rather than the band as a whole, with Rose, Stradlin and Slash contributing to the majority of tracks. Other band members besides Rose performed lead vocals on a number of tracks, and the albums also featured a range of guest musicians including Shannon Hoon, Michael Monroe, and Alice Cooper. Stradlin later left the band and was replaced by Gilby Clarke.

In 1993 the band released "The Spaghetti Incident?", an album of cover versions and the band's first release to feature Clarke. Among others, the album featured recordings of "Raw Power" by The Stooges, "Since I Don't Have You" by The Skyliners and a medley of "Buick Mackane" and "Big Dumb Sex" by T. Rex and Soundgarden, respectively. The following year, Clarke was replaced with Paul Tobias and the band released a cover of The Rolling Stones song "Sympathy for the Devil" for the soundtrack to the film Interview with the Vampire. This would prove to be the final involvement for long-term band members Slash, McKagan, and Sorum, who would later leave at various points over the next few years.

In the years after the release of "The Spaghetti Incident?", Guns N' Roses went through a number of lineup changes during the recording of the long-awaited Chinese Democracy. In 1999, the song "Oh My God" – the band's first original recording since the Use Your Illusion albums – was released on the soundtrack for End of Days, featuring Dave Navarro and Gary Sunshine on guitar. Chinese Democracy was eventually released, after a number of delays, on November 23, 2008, over 17 years after the release of Use Your Illusion I and II. The album featured contributions from most of the members the band had featured between 1994 and 2008, including guitarists Buckethead, Robin Finck and Tobias, drummers Brain and Frank Ferrer, and multi-instrumentalist Chris Pitman, with a number of these performers having co-written songs on the album. Slash and McKagan rejoined the band in 2016, and a remastered box set of Appetite for Destruction was released in 2018, preceded by the lead single "Shadow of Your Love". In 2021, two re-workings of Chinese-era songs were released, "Absurd" and "Hard Skool".

Songs

Unreleased songs

Appetite for Destruction sessions 
 "Sentimental Movie" (recorded during the Appetite for Destruction sessions)
 "Cornshucker" (recorded during the Sound City Studio Sessions produced by Manny Charlton, as well as the GNR Lies sessions)

Use Your Illusion sessions 
 "Bring It Back Home" (recorded during the Use Your Illusion sessions)
 "Crash Diet" (co-written with West Arkeen, Danny Clarke and Del James, recorded during the Use Your Illusion sessions. Recorded by Asphalt Ballet for their second album Pigs (1993) and by Wildside on their 2004 The Wasted Years LP.)
"It Tastes Good, Don't It" (recorded during the Use Your Illusion sessions)
"Just Another Sunday" (recorded during the Use Your Illusion sessions)
 "Too Much Too Soon" (recorded during the Use Your Illusion sessions)
 "Untitled" (played during the Making of Estranged video, later reworked as "Back and Forth Again" on It's Five O'Clock Somewhere by Slash's Snakepit.)

"The Spaghetti Incident?" sessions 
 "A Beer And A Cigarette" (Hanoi Rocks cover, recorded during the Use Your Illusion sessions for potential use on "The Spaghetti Incident?")
 "Down on the Street" (The Stooges cover, recorded during the Use Your Illusion sessions for potential use on "The Spaghetti Incident?")

Chinese Democracy sessions 

In 2019, 19 discs of demos and rough mixes from the Chinese Democracy sessions were leaked online after a fan purchased a storage locker (believed to belong to label rep Tom Zutaut) that contained them. Many previously unknown song titles were revealed from the discs, although the titles may be working titles.

"As It Began" (instrumental recorded during the Chinese Democracy sessions, leaked in 2019)
"Atlas Shrugged" (featuring Brian May, recorded during the Chinese Democracy sessions, full song leaked in 2019)
"Berlin" (originally called Oklahoma, recorded during the Chinese Democracy sessions, instrumental leaked in 2019)
"Better Gone" (a remix of "Better" by Brain, leaked in 2013)
"Billionaire" (instrumental recorded during the Chinese Democracy sessions, leaked in 2019)
"Blood in the Water" (a remix of "Prostitute" by Brain, leaked in 2013)
"Circus Maximus" (instrumental recorded during the Chinese Democracy sessions, leaked in 2019)
"Curly Shuffle" (instrumental recorded during the Chinese Democracy sessions, leaked in 2019)
"D Tune" (instrumental recorded during the Chinese Democracy sessions, leaked in 2019)
"Devious Bastard" (instrumental recorded during the Chinese Democracy sessions, leaked in 2019)
"Down by the Ocean" (co-written by Izzy Stradlin, recorded during the Chinese Democracy sessions)
"Dub Suplex" (instrumental recorded during the Chinese Democracy sessions, leaked in 2019)
"Dummy" (instrumental recorded during the Chinese Democracy sessions, leaked in 2019)
"Elvis Presley and the Monster of Soul" (featuring Marco Beltrami, recorded during the Chinese Democracy sessions, instrumental leaked in 2019)
"Eye On You" (recorded during the Chinese Democracy sessions, full song leaked in 2019)
"Going Down" (sung by Tommy Stinson, recorded during the Chinese Democracy sessions, leaked to the internet in 2013)
"Ides of March" (recorded during the Chinese Democracy sessions)
"Inside Out" (instrumental recorded during the Chinese Democracy sessions, leaked in 2019)
"Mustache" (instrumental recorded during the Chinese Democracy sessions, leaked in 2019)
"Nothing" (recorded during the Chinese Democracy sessions, leaked in 2019)
"Perhaps" (recorded during the Chinese Democracy sessions, full song leaked in 2019)
"P.R.L." (recorded during the Chinese Democracy sessions, instrumental leaked in 2019)
"Prom Violence" (instrumental recorded during the Chinese Democracy sessions, leaked in 2019)
"Quick Song" (recorded during the Chinese Democracy sessions, instrumental leaked in 2019)
"Realdoll.com" (instrumental recorded during the Chinese Democracy sessions, leaked in 2019)
"Seven" (featuring Marco Beltrami, recorded during the Chinese Democracy sessions)
"State of Grace" (recorded during the Chinese Democracy sessions, full song leaked in 2019)
"The General" (featuring Marco Beltrami, recorded during the Chinese Democracy sessions, snippet leaked in 2018)
"The Rebel" (instrumental recorded during the Chinese Democracy sessions, leaked in 2019)
"Tommy Demo #1" (working title for a song featuring Tommy Stinson on lead vocals, recorded during the Chinese Democracy sessions, leaked in 2019)
"Tonto" (instrumental recorded during the Chinese Democracy sessions, leaked in 2019)
"Thyme" (featuring Marco Beltrami, recorded during the Chinese Democracy sessions, instrumental leaked in 2019)
"Zodiac 13" (recorded during the Chinese Democracy sessions, instrumental leaked in 2019)

See also
Guns N' Roses discography

Footnotes

References

External links

List of Guns N' Roses songs at Allmusic

Guns N' Roses